Astrosa is a genus of moths belonging to the subfamily Tortricinae of the family Tortricidae. It contains only one species, Astrosa leucosema, which is found in Indonesia (Java).

See also
List of Tortricidae genera

References

External links
tortricidae.com

Cnephasiini
Monotypic moth genera
Moths of Indonesia
Tortricidae genera